Ward is an unincorporated community in Stevens County, in the U.S. state of Washington. It is located a mile-and-a-half east of Kettle Falls on U.S. Route 395.

History
A post office called Ward was established in 1904, and remained in operation until 1933. The community has the name of Thomas Ward.

References

Unincorporated communities in Stevens County, Washington
Unincorporated communities in Washington (state)